10 Years Younger in 10 Days, previously called 10 Years Younger (and sometimes called 10 Years Younger: The Challenge), is a make over show aired on Channel 5 in Britain and repeated on its 5Star network. As 10 Years Younger, the series debuted as a Channel 4 programme in 2004, before being relaunched and rebranded by Channel 5 in 2020.

Presented for its first five series by Nicky Hambleton-Jones, who was replaced by Myleene Klass for series six, with Cherry Healey hosting the show for Channel 5, with the programme's full name also being used in Australia.

About the show
With the help of experts the participant of the show is given a complete make over in an attempt to make them look 10 Years Younger, partially through plastic surgery. At the start of the programme the person's age is guessed by 100 people on the street and an average is taken. From this average the target image is set. At the end of the show this happens again to see the results.

The programme regularly makes use of cosmetic surgery, which has attracted criticism from some quarters. However, in his book 10 Years Younger: Cosmetic Surgery Bible, the show's resident consultant surgeon Jan Stanek says: "I decided to take part in the series because I felt that it offered an opportunity to shine an honest light on what was involved in cosmetic surgery and to address some of the common misconceptions about it."

Experts
Presenter:
Series 1–5: Nicky Hambleton-Jones (and clothing stylist)
Series 6: Myleene Klass
Series 6: Denise Welch (Narrator)
Series 7-8: Cherry Healey (Channel 5, Series 1-2)
Jan Stanek - Cosmetic surgery
Dr Uchenna Okoye - Dentistry
John Vial - Hair
Andrew Barton - Hair
Guy Parsons - Hair
Karen Melvin - Hair Colour
Ruby Hammer - Make-up (Series 1–5)
Lisa Eldridge - Make-up
Kat Byrne - Behind the scenes assistance with clothing
Dan Reinstein - Specialist Laser Eye Surgery Ophthalmic Surgeon

Books
There are currently three books which accompany the series. The first two are both written by former presenter Nicky Hambleton-Jones. The third book is written by Jan Stanek with Hayley Treacy.

10 Years Younger in 10 Days (Paperback - 17 January 2005)
10 Years Younger Nutrition Bible (Paperback - 2 February 2006)
10 Years Younger Cosmetic Surgery Bible (Paperback - 1 February 2007)

International versions

See also
 London Welbeck Hospital - a hospital used in the show

References

External links
10 Years Younger at Channel4.com
10 Years Younger Top pick on Maverick Television site

10 Years Younger Review
 Review, Leicester Mercury
Live Show

Channel 4 original programming
2004 British television series debuts
2000s British reality television series
2010s British reality television series
2020s British reality television series
English-language television shows
Television series by All3Media
Television series about plastic surgery